José María Lacunza Blengio (18 August 1809 – 2 January 1869) was a Mexican politician and diplomat. As a columnist he wrote for El Mosaico Mexicano, El Siglo Diez y Nueve and El Monitor Republicano.

He was the President of the Chamber of Deputies in 1848. From 10 May 1849 to 15 January 1851, he held the position of Minister of Relations during the government of José Joaquín de Herrera. During his tenure, he was in charge of handling the debt with the Spanish creditors. Additionally, he worked on the Treaty of Guadalupe-Hidalgo, rejecting the free passage through the Isthmus of Tehuantepec, which the United States government claimed, could maintain the negative in favor of national sovereignty. He was president of the Senate and was in charge of the Directorate General of Funds and Public Instruction, being Minister of Finance during the presidential term of Benito Juárez.

During the Second Mexican Empire he was Minister of State of Maximilian of Habsburg and promoter of cultural policy. Overthrown the Empire was banished to La Habana where he died in 1869.

References 

19th-century Mexican politicians
Presidents of the Chamber of Deputies (Mexico)
Mexican columnists
Mexican Empire
Mexican diplomats
1809 births
1869 deaths
Mexican people of Italian descent
Politicians from Mexico City